Auratonota effera is a species of moth of the family Tortricidae. It is found in Mexico.

The wingspan is about 11 mm. The ground colour of the forewings is golden yellow, slightly mixed with ochreous, especially in the basal area. The colour is glossy cream along the edges of the markings. These markings are less glossy, golden ochreous, with brownish edges. The hindwings are brownish with a paler base.

References

Moths described in 2000
Auratonota
Moths of Central America